Greentown may refer to:

Greentown, Indiana, town in Howard County, Indiana, United States
Greentown, Ohio, census-designated place in Stark County, Ohio, United States
Greentown, Jefferson County, Ohio, unincorporated community in Jefferson County, Ohio, United States
Greentown, Pennsylvania
Greentown China, a property developer headquartered in Hangzhou, China
Hangzhou Greentown F.C., Chinese football club